Sloane Blakely (born December 23, 2002) is an American collegiate artistic gymnast and was a member of the United States women's national gymnastics team.  She is currently competing for the Florida Gators in NCAA gymnastics.  She is the older sister of gymnast Skye Blakely.

Early life 
Blakely was born to Steven and Stephanie Blakely in 2002 in Dallas, Texas and has one sibling, Skye.  She originally did ballet and tap dancing prior to starting gymnastics training.

Gymnastics career

Junior elite

2016
Blakely qualified as a junior elite in 2016.  She made her elite debut at the 2016 U.S. Classic where she placed 21st in the all-around.  She next competed at the U.S. National Championships where she finished 18th.

Senior elite

2018 
Blakely turned senior in 2018.  She made her senior debut at the American Classic where she placed sixth in the all-around.  Later that month she competed at the 2018 U.S. Classic where she placed seventh in the all-around and fourth on balance beam.  In August Blakely competed at the 2018 U.S. National Gymnastics Championships.  She finished 16th in the all-around.

2019 
In February Blakely was named to the team to compete at 2019 L'International Gymnix in Montreal, alongside Kara Eaker, Aleah Finnegan, and Alyona Shchennikova.  As a result, she was named to the national team for the first time.  While there she helped the USA win team gold and individually she won silver on balance beam behind Eaker and finished fourth on floor exercise.

In June Blakely competed at the American Classic where she placed first on balance beam, second on vault behind Faith Torrez, and fifth on floor exercise.  After the conclusion of the American Classic, Blakely was named as one of the eight athletes being considered for the team that would compete at the 2019 Pan American Games, along with Kara Eaker, Aleah Finnegan, Morgan Hurd, Shilese Jones, Sunisa Lee, Riley McCusker and Leanne Wong.  The following month Blakely competed at the U.S. Classic where she only competed on vault, balance beam, and floor exercise.  She was not selected to compete at the Pan American Games.

In August Blakely competed at the U.S. National Championships where she once again only competed on vault, balance beam, and floor exercise.  She finished ninth and sixteenth on the latter two events.

2020 
Blakely competed at the 2020 L'International Gymnix as a Challenger and not part of national team.  She finished first in the all-around and on balance beam.  In November Blakely signed her National Letter of Intent with the Florida Gators.

Level 10

2021 
Blakely dropped down to level 10.  She qualified to and competed at the Nastia Liukin Cup where she finished 13th.  In May Blakely competed at the Developmental National Championships where she placed first in the senior-F division and swept titles on all apparatuses.  In doing so Blakely became the first level 10 gymnast to sweep all of the titles at a National Championships.

NCAA

2021–2022 season 
Blakely made her NCAA debut on January 7 in a quad meet against Rutgers, Northern Illinois, and Texas Women's.  She competed on all four apparatuses and had the highest all-around and balance beam scores of the meet.  Blakely became the first Florida Gator gymnast since Kytra Hunter in 2012 to win the all-around in a debut collegiate meet.  As a result Blakely was named SEC Gymnast of the Week.  In doing so she became the first freshman to earn the opening SEC Gymnast of the Week honor of a season since the honor began in 2000.

Career perfect 10.0

Competitive history

References

External links
 
 

2002 births
Living people
African-American female gymnasts
American female artistic gymnasts
U.S. women's national team gymnasts
Sportspeople from Dallas
Gymnasts from Texas
People from Frisco, Texas
21st-century African-American sportspeople
21st-century African-American women
Florida Gators women's gymnasts
NCAA gymnasts who have scored a perfect 10